Paratype nigra is a moth in the subfamily Arctiinae. It was described by Reich in 1936. It is found in Brazil.

References

Lithosiini
Moths described in 1936